Spain participated in and won the Junior Eurovision Song Contest 2004 with the song "Antes muerta que sencilla", performed by María Isabel. Spanish broadcaster Televisión Española (TVE) organised the national final Eurojunior 2004 in order to select the Spanish entry for the 2004 Contest in Lillehammer, Norway.

Before Junior Eurovision

Eurojunior 2004 
Eurojunior 2004 was the second edition of Eurojunior, the Spanish national final to select the Spanish entry for the Junior Eurovision Song Contest.

Competing artists 
3,000 artists have been presented to the first phase of the casting, which was held across 12 Spanish cities (Barcelona, San Sebastian, Madrid, Seville, Granada, Palma de Mallorca, Santiago de Compostela, Zaragoza, Alicante, Valencia, Oviedo and Las Palmas de Gran Canaria) during March and April 2004. 150 artists entered the second phase of the casting which took place between late April and early May 2004, of which only 80 were selected. The 80 selected artists entered the Academy on 19 June 2004, of which 40 finalists were ultimately chosen.

Format 
The competition had two phases. The first phase had a talent show format: it consisted of five live shows that aired in July 2004 where the contestants performed cover versions of popular songs, with the aim of advancing to the final phase. The final phase consisted of three live shows.

Shows

Show 1 (7 September 2004) 
In the first live show, aired on 7 September 2004, each finalist performed two candidate songs, and the televote was opened at the end of the show to select the preferred song from each act.

Show 2 (14 September 2004) 
The second live show was aired on 14 September 2004. Each act performed one song, and the televote was opened at the end of the show to select the winner.

Show 3 (21 September 2004) 
During the third show aired on 21 September 2004, María Isabel was announced as the winner of Eurojunior 2004 with the song "Antes muerta que sencilla", Blas Cantó ended in 2nd position.

At Junior Eurovision

Voting

References 

Spain
Junior Eurovision Song Contest
Junior